Saruplase is a fibrinolytic enzyme.

It is closely related to urokinase.

References

External links
 

Antithrombotic enzymes